George Henry Lee II, 3rd Earl of Lichfield PC (1718–1772) was a British politician and peer. He was made a Privy Councillor and Captain of the Gentlemen-at-Arms in 1762, holding both honours until death. Previously, he had served as member of parliament for Oxfordshire from 1740 until acceding to the peerage in 1743.

Birth and origins 

George was born on 21 May 1718 in London. He was the son of George Henry Lee I, 2nd Earl of Lichfield and his wife Frances Hales. His father was the 2nd Earl of Lichfield and a great-grandson of King Charles II through his illegitimate daughter Charlotte Fitzroy by his mistress Barbara Villiers.

George's mother was a daughter of Sir John Hales, 4th Baronet of Hackington, who had brought her up as a Catholic and was the 2nd Earl of Tenterden in the Jacobite peerage. George had two brothers and six sisters, who are listed in his father's article.

Early life 
From birth he was styled Viscount Quarendon as heir apparent. In the family tradition, he was educated at St John's College, Oxford. On 14 February 1732 he was made an M.A. of Oxford.

In 1740 and from 1741 to 1742, he served as member of parliament (MP) for the county of Oxford. On 15 February 1743, his father died and Viscount Quarendon became the 3rd Earl of Lichfield.

He continued his law studies at Oxford and earned his D.C.L. of Oxford on 25 August 1743. 23 years later, on 19 August of the year 1760, Lichfield received the great position of High Steward of the University of Oxford.

On 9 December 1760, he became Lord of the Bedchamber to King George III; and on 12 July 1762, Captain of the Band of Gentlemen Pensioners. He joined the Privy Council on 14 July 1762. He replaced George Huddesford as the Deputy Ranger of Hampton Court Park in July 1762. Finally, on 23 September 1762, he assumed the role of Chancellor of the University of Oxford.

From the Gentleman's Magazine, XXXIII., p. 349:

"The graceful dignity, the political condescension, the ne quid nimis ('Let there be nothing in Excess') of the Chancellor were universally admired" – 1763.

He became a vice-president of the Society of Arts; and a deputy lieutenant for Oxfordshire county on 17  October 1763.

Marriage 
On 16 January 1745, in Bath, Lord Lichfield married Diana or Dinah, daughter and coheir of Sir Thomas Frankland; they had no children.

Death 
Lord Lichfield died on 17 September 1772. The Earldom of Lichfield passed to his uncle Robert Lee.

End of the line 
The 3rd and 4th earls, George Henry II and Robert Lee respectively, died without issue, therefore the estate eventually reverted to the 2nd Earl's eldest surviving daughter, and sister of the 3rd Earl, Lady Charlotte Lee. In 1744 Charlotte had married the 11th Viscount Dillon. Their son Charles Dillon, 12th Viscount Dillon inherited the estate of Ditchley but not the title. Ditchley remained the home of the Viscounts Dillon until 1934.

The title would be created for a third time when Thomas Anson would be created Earl of Lichfield in the coronation honours of William IV in 1831.

Notes and references

Notes

Citations

Sources 

  – L to M (for Lichfield)
  – (for timeline)

Further reading
Murdoch, Tessa (ed.), Noble Households: Eighteenth-Century Inventories of Great English Houses (Cambridge, John Adamson, 2006)  . For an inventory of the earl's furniture, paintings, linen and china at Ditchley, Oxfordshire, following his death in 1772, see pp. 153–65.

1718 births
1772 deaths
Alumni of St John's College, Oxford
British MPs 1734–1741
British MPs 1741–1747
Lichfield, George Lee, 3rd Earl of
Deputy Lieutenants of Oxfordshire
3rd Earl of Lichfield
Honourable Corps of Gentlemen at Arms
Members of the Parliament of Great Britain for English constituencies
Members of the Privy Council of the United Kingdom
People from Windsor, Berkshire